Morarji Desai Setu is a weir-cum-causeway on the Tapi River in Surat, Gujarat, India. It connects Rander and Katargam neighbourhoods.

See also
 Tapi Riverfront
 Cable Bridge Surat
 Gaurav Path

References

Further reading
 Surat Municipal Corporation Bridge-Cell, Weir-cum-Causeway Project Detail, Plan Detail

Buildings and structures in Surat
Bridges in Gujarat
Transport in Surat